ISO 3166-2:IN is the entry for India in ISO 3166-2, part of the ISO 3166 standard published by the International Organization for Standardization (ISO), which defines codes for the names of the principal subdivisions (e.g., provinces or states) of all countries coded in ISO 3166-1.

Currently for India, ISO 3166-2 codes are defined for 28 states and 8 union territories.

Each code consists of two parts, separated by a hyphen. The second part is two letters, currently used in vehicle registration plates with some exceptions.



Current codes

Subdivision names are listed as in the ISO 3166-2 standard published by the ISO 3166 Maintenance Agency (ISO 3166/MA).

Notes

Changes
The following changes to the entry have been announced in newsletters by the ISO 3166/MA since the first publication of ISO 3166-2 in 1998. ISO stopped issuing newsletters in 2013.

The following changes to the entry are listed on ISO's online catalogue, the Online Browsing Platform:

See also
 Subdivisions of India
 FIPS region codes of India

References

External links
 ISO Online Browsing Platform: IN
 States of India, Statoids.com

2:IN
States and union territories of India-related lists
Standards of India
Lists of subdivisions of India